Maslul (lit. Path, Way) is a moshav in southern Israel. Located in the north-western Negev near Ofakim with an area of 8,000 dunams, it falls under the jurisdiction of Merhavim Regional Council.

History
The moshav was established in 1950 by immigrants from Iran. Like several other moshavim in the area, its name is taken from the Book of Isaiah 35:8;
And a highway shall be there, and a way, and it shall be called the way of holiness; the unclean shall not pass over it; but it shall be for those; the wayfaring men, yea fools, shall not err therein.

References

External links
Maslul Negev Information Centre

Iranian-Jewish culture in Israel
Moshavim
Populated places established in 1950
Populated places in Southern District (Israel)
1950 establishments in Israel